Vif is a commune in the Isère department in southeastern France.

The town hosts the Champollion Museum, located in the former residence of the Champollion family. Closed for work, it reopened in June 2021.

Geography
Vif is situated in the Valley of Gresse, in the south of Grenoble, upon the north-east foothills of the Vercors. The town is crossed by the Gresse river (which come from Gresse-en-Vercors). Vif lies 16 km (10 mi) south of Grenoble, 65 km (40 mi) north-west of Gap and 65 km (40 mi) north-east of Valence.

Population

Sights

 Vif is the home of the Champollion Museum (Vif), settled in the former family house of Jacques-Joseph Champollion-Figeac and his wife Zoé Berriat.
 The city is the cradle of the French company Vicat, founded by Joseph Vicat (son of Louis Vicat). The first ciment works was built in Genevrey-de-Vif in 1857.
 The town hosts two churches : Saint-Jean-Baptiste de Vif and Saint-Marie du Genevrey, which is one of the oldest medieval church in Grenoble métropole.
 The actual town hall was an ancient monastery until 1792, then a silk mill managed by the Berriat family.

 
The « Line of Alps », a railway connecting Grenoble to Gap via the Alps, cross the town territory on a 19th century's railway viaduct : the viaduct of Crozet (viaduc du Crozet).

Personalities

 Charles Le Goux de La Berchère (1647-1719), bishop
 Jacques-Joseph Champollion-Figeac (1778-1867), archaeologist, brother of Champollion le Jeune
 Jean-François Champollion (1790-1832), philologist and orientalist, decipherer of Egyptian hieroglpyhs
 Francois Jean Rochas Frenchy (1843-1894), first settler of today's Oliver Lee Memorial State Park (New Mexico)
 Yves de La Brière (1877-1941), French Jesuit born in Vif.

Twin town - sister city
Vif is twinned with:
 Rivalta di Torino, Italy, since 1985.

See also
Communes of the Isère department

References

Communes of Isère
Isère communes articles needing translation from French Wikipedia